WUPS (98.5 FM) is a 100 kW radio station licensed to Harrison, Michigan and serving central and northern Michigan, with its chief focus on the Mount Pleasant area. The station, previously owned by Sindy Fuller, through licensee Bridge to Bridge, Inc., was acquired by Black Diamond Broadcast Group, LLC in 2015 and broadcasts a classic hits format. Black Diamond's purchase of both WUPS and sister station WTWS was consummated on February 4, 2015 at a price of $1.65 million.

The station signed on in 1961 to complement its sister station, WHGR/1290 (the callsign stood for Houghton Lake/Grayling/Roscommon). In the beginning, the station, known as WJGS (for owners Jacob and Garnett Sparks), was 19,000 watts. In the 1960s, a fire destroyed the WJGS/WHGR studios right before Christmas. They ended up broadcasting from a trailer until a new building was built.

Throughout most of the 1960s and through the 1980s, WJGS was automated MOR.  During the '80s, WJGS was also an affiliate of Casey Kasem's American Top 40 countdown show.

In 1983, Sparks Broadcasting sold the stations to Shea Broadcasting, who sold it to Melling Tool and Die in 1988. WJGS's power was increased to 100,000 watts, flipped to CHR and became WUPS. The station was named after the United Parcel Service, for their longtime slogan is "We Deliver the Hits".

With its central location in Houghton Lake, WUPS's signal is heard in most of northern and central Michigan, with a coverage area stretching from Indian River southward to Ithaca. WUPS's 100,000–watt signal can reach further south as well. It is common for reception in the mid-Michigan thumb and Saginaw Bay as well, a good 100 miles from its transmitter. For a short time in the early 1990s, the station was simulcasted to the Traverse City, Michigan area on WMLB 98.1 (now WGFN; ironically now a sister station to WUPS).

Throughout most of the 1990s, WUPS's format changed several times: adult top 40, hot AC, all-1970s, all-1970s-1980s, classic hits/hot AC hybrid and its current format, 1960s-1980s classic hits.

In 1998, John Salov bought out Melling and created a huge controversy in 2001 when he sold WHGR - then satellite-fed standards - to Clear Channel Communications for $250,000, making it their first property in northern Michigan. However, they bought out WHGR for only one reason: to shut it down. They wanted to expand their Grand Rapids station, WOOD/1300 to 25,000 watts, and the only way to do so was to shut down WHGR. The move stunned many people in the Houghton Lake area who had grown up with the station.

Today, WUPS broadcasts from studios on M-18/M-55 in Prudenville, as their old studio was destroyed to make way for a Wal-Mart in Houghton Lake many years ago.  The station previous broadcast from the top of Mid Michigan Community College in Mount Pleasant, Michigan.

WUPS recently changed its city of license from Houghton Lake to Harrison with no change in transmitter location or signal.  To maintain local radio service to Houghton Lake, country music sister station WTWS (The Twister) moved to Houghton Lake.

References
Michiguide.com - WUPS History

External links

UPS
Classic hits radio stations in the United States
Clare County, Michigan
Radio stations established in 1961